Richard Birkeland (6 June 1879 – 10 April 1928) was a Norwegian mathematician, author and professor. He is known for his contributions to the theory of algebraic equations.

Biography
He was born at Farsund in Vest-Agder, Norway. He was the son of Theodor Birkeland (1834-1913) and Therese Karoline Overwien (1846-1883). He graduated from the Christiania Technical School in 1899. In 1906,  he received a scholarship to study mathematics in Paris and Göttingen. He became a professor at the Norwegian Institute of Technology from 1910.  He was rector of the Norwegian Institute of Technology and from 1923 professor at the University of Oslo. 

He was a co-founder of the Norwegian Mathematical Society in 1918 and he was its vice chairman in the early years. He was for a time chairman of Trondheim Polytechnic Association.   He was decorated Knight of the Order of St. Olav.

Selected works
Sur certaines singularités des équations différentielles  (1909) 
Lærebok i matematisk analyse : differential- og integralregning, differentialligninger tillæg  (1917)

Personal life
He was a cousin of physics professor Kristian Birkeland (1867-1917). In 1909, he  married  Agnes Hoff (1883-1980). Their son Øivind (1910-2004) was a civil engineer.

References

1879 births
1928 deaths
People from Farsund
Norwegian mathematicians
Norwegian educators
Academic staff of the University of Oslo
Academic staff of the Norwegian Institute of Technology
Rectors of the Norwegian University of Science and Technology
Recipients of the St. Olav's Medal